Howard Ungerleider (born 1968) is an American business executive who is the chief financial officer (CFO) and president of Dow Inc., following five years as CFO of DowDuPont Inc.

Early life and education
Howard Ungerleider was born in 1968.

Career
Ungerleider began his career at Dow Chemical in 1990 and held a number of roles prior to being named Dow's CFO in 2014, including North American Commercial Vice President for Dow's Basic Plastics businesses (2006–2008), and Vice President of Investor Relations (2008–2011). In 2016, he was named the future CFO of DowDupont.

In 2006 he was named Commercial Vice President for Dow's basic plastics units in North America. Until 2011 Ungerleider served as Vice President of Investor Relations, before being named President of Dow's Performance Plastics division. In 2012 he also joined Dow's most senior executive team. According to Dow, the Advanced Materials division grew to approximately $11 billion in annual sales during his tenure.

Ungerleider was elected Dow's Chief Financial Officer (CFO) by Dow's Board of Directors on October 1, 2014.

In May 2016 he was named the future Chief Financial Officer of DowDuPont, to be effective upon the closure of the merger of Dow and DuPont. The combined company was also slated to subsequently separate into three independent publicly traded companies, individually focused on agriculture, materials science and specialty products. Ungerleider resigned from the board of directors on April 1, 2019, when Dow separated from DowDuPont, and became the CFO and president of the newly formed Dow Inc.

References

1968 births
Dow Chemical Company employees
Directors of DuPont
American chief financial officers
Living people
Dow Inc.